The 1942 Texas Mines Miners football team was an American football team that represented Texas School of Mines (now known as University of Texas at El Paso) as a member of the Border Conference during the 1942 college football season. In its first and only season under head coach Walter Milner, the team compiled a 5–4 record (4–3 against Border Conference opponents), finished fifth in the conference, and outscored opponents by a total of 162 to 111.

Schedule

References

Texas Mines
UTEP Miners football seasons
Texas Mines Miners football